Ulf Söderström (born September 19, 1972) is a Swedish former professional ice hockey centre. During his career, Söderström played in the Elitserien for Linköping HC and Färjestads BK. For his achievements during the 2001–2002 season, he was awarded Guldhjälmen.

Career statistics

References

External links

1972 births
Living people
Swedish ice hockey centres
Färjestad BK players
Linköping HC players